Heliaster is a genus of Asteroidea (sea stars) in the family Heliasteridae.

Species
Heliaster canopus Perrier, 1875
Heliaster cumingi (Gray, 1840)
Heliaster helianthus (Lamarck, 1816)
Heliaster kubiniji Xantus, 1860
Heliaster microbrachius Xantus, 1860
Heliaster polybrachius H.L. Clark, 1907
Heliaster solaris A.H. Clark, 1920

Fossil record
Whole specimens of Heliaster microbrachius have been found preserved in calcite-cemented quartz in Southwest Florida that dates to the Pliocene, 3.5 to 2.5 million years ago (Castilla et al. 2013).  Today H. microbrachius is found only in the Pacific Ocean: on the coast of Panama, and Acapulco in Mexico.  This suggests that greater connection between the two oceans gave the species a more extensive range in the past (Castilla et al. 2013).

References

 Castilla, Juan Carlos, Sergio A. Navarrete, Tatiana Manzur, and Mario Barahona.  2013.  Heliaster helianthus. Chapter 15, pp. 153–160 in John M. Lawrence, ed. 2013. Starfish. Biology and Ecology of the Asteroidea.  Johns Hopkins University Press, Baltimore.
 Gray J.E. (1840). A synopsis of the genera and species of the class Hypostoma (Asterias Linnaeus). Annals of the Magazine of Natural History 6: 175-184; 275-290

 
Asteroidea genera
Taxa named by John Edward Gray